Georges-Hilaire Dupont, O.M.I.  (16 November 1919 – 29 January 2020) was a French prelate of the Roman Catholic Church.

Dupont was born in Virey, France in November 1919. He was ordained a priest on 9 May 1943 for Missionary Oblates of Mary Immaculate. Dupont was appointed to the Diocese of Pala on 16 January 1964 and consecrated on 1 May 1964. He resigned from the diocese on 28 June 1975. Dupont died in January 2020 at the age of 100.

References

External links
Catholic-Hierarchy

1919 births
2020 deaths
20th-century Roman Catholic bishops in Chad
French centenarians
20th-century French Roman Catholic bishops
Participants in the Second Vatican Council
Missionary Oblates of Mary Immaculate
People from Manche
Roman Catholic bishops of Pala
Men centenarians